Ho Chi Minh City Department of Transportation and Public Works is a city department responsible for transportation and public works projects in Ho Chi Minh City.

The department also operates public bus system in a city of cars and motorcycles and service is inferior compared to Saigon Passenger Transportation Company.

Fleet
The fleet consists of green air-conditioned buses made by Saigon Automobile Transportation Engineering Corporation and based on South Korean design (Daewoo).

 Isuzu Samco Egra Mio medium-duty buses
The department aims to purchase electric buses for the Saigon BRT.

See also
 Saigon Passenger Transportation Company

References 

Transport in Ho Chi Minh City
Bus companies of Vietnam
Road transport in Ho Chi Minh City
Public transport in Ho Chi Minh City